Sayyid Morteza Saghaeiannejad (spelled more correctly Saghayannezhad ) is an Iranian academic professor. He currently serves as Electrical Engineering professor at Isfahan University of Technology in his hometown Isfahan.

References

External links 

 

1952 births
Living people
University of Colorado Boulder alumni
University of Kentucky alumni
Mayors of Isfahan
Islamic Society of Engineers politicians
Impeached Iranian officials removed from office